A power loom is a mechanized loom, and was one of the key developments in the industrialization of weaving  during the early Industrial Revolution.  The first power loom was designed and patented in 1785 by Edmund Cartwright. It was refined over the next 47 years until a design by the Howard and Bullough company made the operation completely automatic. This device was designed in 1834 by James Bullough and William Kenworthy, and was named the Lancashire loom.

By the year 1850, there were a total of around 260,000 power loom operations in England. Two years later came the Northrop loom which replenished the shuttle when it was empty. This replaced the Lancashire loom.

Shuttle looms

The main components of the loom are the warp beam, heddles, harnesses, shuttle, reed, and takeup roll. In the loom, yarn processing includes shedding, picking, battening and taking-up operations.

 Shedding. Shedding is the raising of the warp yarns to form a loop through which the filling yarn, carried by the shuttle, can be inserted. The shed is the vertical space between the raised and unraised warp yarns. On the modern loom, simple and intricate shedding operations are performed automatically by the heddle or heald frame, also known as a harness. This is a rectangular frame to which a series of wires, called heddles or healds, are attached. The yarns are passed through the eye holes of the heddles, which hang vertically from the harnesses. The weave pattern determines which harness controls which warp yarns, and the number of harnesses used depends on the complexity of the weave. Two common methods of controlling the heddles are dobbies and a Jacquard Head. 
 Picking. As the harnesses raise the heddles or healds, which raise the warp yarns, the shed is created. The filling yarn is inserted through the shed by a small carrier device called a shuttle. The shuttle is normally pointed at each end to allow passage through the shed. In a traditional shuttle loom, the filling yarn is wound onto a quill, which in turn is mounted in the shuttle. The filling yarn emerges through a hole in the shuttle as it moves across the loom. A single crossing of the shuttle from one side of the loom to the other is known as a pick. As the shuttle moves back and forth across the shed, it weaves an edge, or selvage, on each side of the fabric to prevent the fabric from raveling. 
 Battening. As the shuttle moves across the loom laying down the fill yarn, it also passes through openings in another frame called a reed (which resembles a comb). With each picking operation, the reed presses or battens each filling yarn against the portion of the fabric that has already been formed. The point where the fabric is formed is called the fell. Conventional shuttle looms can operate at speeds of about 150 to 200 picks per minute
 
With each weaving operation, the newly constructed fabric must be wound on a cloth beam. This process is called taking up. At the same time, the warp yarns must be let off or released from the warp beams. To become fully automatic, a loom needs a filling stop motion which will brake the loom, if the weft thread breaks.

Operation 

Operation of weaving in a textile mill is undertaken by a specially trained operator known as a weaver. Weavers are expected to uphold high industry standards and are tasked with monitoring anywhere from ten to as many as thirty separate looms at any one time.  During their operating shift, weavers will first utilize a wax pencil or crayon to sign their initials onto the cloth to mark a shift change, and then walk along the cloth side (front) of the looms they tend, gently touching the fabric as it comes from the reed. This is done to feel for any broken "picks" or filler thread. Should broken picks be detected, the weaver will disable the machine and undertake to correct the error, typically by replacing the bobbin of filler thread in as little time as possible. They are trained that, ideally, no machine should stop working for more than one minute, with faster turn around times being preferred.

Operation of this needs more than 2 people because of the way it works.

History

The first ideas for an automatic loom were developed in 1784 by M. de Gennes in Paris and by Vaucanson in 1745, but these designs were never developed and were forgotten.  In 1785 Edmund Cartwright patented a power loom which used water power to speed up the weaving process, the predecessor to the modern power loom. His ideas were licensed first by Grimshaw of Manchester who built a small steam-powered weaving factory in Manchester in 1790, but the factory burnt down. Cartwright's was not a commercially successful machine; his looms had to be stopped to dress the warp. Over the next decades, Cartwright's ideas were modified into a reliable automatic loom.

These designs preceded John Kay's invention of the flying shuttle and they passed the shuttle through the shed using levers. With the increased speed of weaving, weavers were able to use more thread than spinners could produce.

Series of initial inventors
A series of inventors incrementally improved all aspects of the three principle processes and the ancillary processes. 
 Grimshaw of Manchester (1790): dressing the warp 
 Austin (1789, 1790): dressing the warp, 200 looms produced for Monteith of Pollockshaws 1800
 Thomas Johnson of Bredbury (1803): dressing frame, factory for 200 Steam Looms on Manchester 1806, and two factories at Stockport 1809. One at Westhoughton, Lancashire (1809).
 William Radcliffe of Stockport (1802): improved take up mechanism
 John Todd of Burnley (1803): a heald roller and new shedding arrangements, the healds were corded to treadles actuated by cams on the second shaft.
 William Horrocks of Stockport (1803): The frame was still wooden but the lathe was pendant from the frame and operated by cams on the first shaft, the shedding was operated by cams on the second shaft, the take up motion was copied from Radcliffe.
 Peter Marsland (1806): improvements to the lathe motion to counteract poor picking
 William Cotton (1810): improvements to the letting off motion
 William Horrocks (1813): Horrocks loom, Modifications to the lathe motion, improving on Marsland
 Peter Ewart (1813): a use of pneumatics
 Joseph and Peter Taylor (1815): double beat foot lathe for heavy cloths
 Paul Moody (1815): produces the first power loom in North America. Exporting a UK loom would have been illegal.
 John Capron and Sons (1820): installed the first power looms for woolens in North America at Uxbridge, Massachusetts.
 William Horrocks (1821): a system to wet the warp and weft during use, improving the effectiveness of the sizing
 Richard Roberts (1830): Roberts Loom, These improvements were a geared take up wheel and tappets to operate multiple heddles
 Stanford, Pritchard and Wilkinson: patented a method to stop on the break of weft or warp. It was not used.
 William Dickinson of Blackburn: Blackburn Loom, the modern overpick

Further useful improvements
There now appear a series of useful improvements that are contained in patents for useless devices
 Horny, Kenworthy and Bullough of Blackburn (1834): the vibrating or fly reed
 John Ramsbottom and Richard Holt of Todmorden (1834): a new automatic weft stopping motion
 James Bullough of Blackburn (1835): improved automatic weft stopping motion and taking up and letting off arrangements
 Andrew Parkinson (1836): improved stretcher (temple).
 William Kenworthy and James Bullough (1841): trough and roller temple (became the standard), A simple stop-motion.
At this point the loom has become automatic except for refilling weft pirns. The Cartwight loom weaver could work one loom at 120-130 picks per minute- with a Kenworthy and Bullough's Lancashire Loom, a weaver can run four or more looms working at 220-260 picks per minute- thus giving eight (or more) times more throughput.
 James Henry Northrop (1894) invented a self-threading shuttle and shuttle spring jaws to hold a bobbin by means of rings on the butt. This paved the way to his automatic filling and changing battery of 1891, the basic feature of the Northrop Loom. The principal advantage of the Northrop loom was that it was fully automatic; when a warp thread broke, the loom stopped until it was fixed. When the shuttle ran out of thread, Northrop's mechanism ejected the depleted pirn and loaded a new full one without stopping. A loom operative could work 16 or more looms whereas previously they could only operate eight. Thus, the labor cost was halved. Mill owners had to decide whether the labor saving was worth the capital investment in a new loom. In all 700,000 looms were sold. By 1914, Northrop looms made up 40% of American looms. Northrop was responsible for several hundred weaving related patents.

Looms and the Manchester context
The development of the power loom in and around Manchester was not a coincidence. Manchester had been a centre for Fustians by 1620 and acted as a hub for other Lancashire towns, so developing a communication network with them. It was an established point of export using the meandering River Mersey, and by 1800 it had a thriving canal network, with links to the Ashton Canal, Rochdale Canal the Peak Forest Canal and Manchester Bolton & Bury Canal. The fustian trade gave the towns a skilled workforce that was used to the complicated Dutch looms, and was perhaps accustomed to industrial discipline. While Manchester became a spinning town, the towns around were weaving towns producing cloth by the putting out system. The business was dominated by a few families, who had the capital needed to invest in new mills and to buy hundreds of looms. Mills were built along the new canals, so immediately had access to their markets. Spinning developed first and, until 1830, the handloom was still more important economically than the power loom when the roles reversed. Because of the economic growth of Manchester, a new industry of precision machine tool engineering was born and here were the skills needed to build the precision mechanisms of a loom.

Adoption
{| class=wikitable
|+Number of Looms in UK
|Year||1803||1820||1829||1833||1857
|-
|Looms||2,400||14,650||55,500||100,000||250,000
|}

Draper' strategy was to standardize on a couple of Northrop Loom models which it mass-produced. The lighter E-model of 1909 was joined in the 1930 by the heavier X-model. Continuous fibre machines, say for rayon, which was more break-prone, needed a specialist loom. This was provided by the purchase of the Stafford Loom Co. in 1932, and using their patents a third loom the XD, was added to the range. Because of their mass production techniques they were reluctant and slow to retool for new technologies such as shuttleless looms.

Decline and reinvention
Originally, power looms used a shuttle to throw the weft across, but in 1927 the faster and more efficient shuttleless loom came into use. Sulzer Brothers, a Swiss company had the exclusive rights to shuttleless looms in 1942, and licensed the American production to Warner & Swasey. Draper licensed the slower rapier loom. Today, advances in technology have produced a variety of looms designed to maximise production for specific types of material. The most common of these are Sulzer shuttleless weaving machines, rapier looms, air-jet looms and water-jet looms.

Social and economic implications

Power looms reduced demand for skilled handweavers, initially causing reduced wages and unemployment. Protests followed their introduction. For example, in 1816 two thousand rioting Calton weavers tried to destroy power loom mills and stoned the workers.
In the longer term, by making cloth more affordable the power loom increased demand and stimulated exports, causing a growth in industrial employment, albeit low-paid.
The power loom also opened up opportunities for women mill workers.
A darker side of the power loom's impact was the growth of employment of children in power loom mills.

Dangers 

There are a number of inherent dangers in the machines, to which inattentive or poorly trained weavers can fall victim. The most obvious is the moving reed, the frames which hold the heddles and the "pinch" or "sand" roll utilized to keep the cloth tight as it passes over the front of the machine and onto the doff roll. The most common injury in weaving is pinched fingers from distracted or bored workers, though this is not the only such injury found. There are numerous accounts of weavers with long hair getting it tangled in the warp itself and having their scalp pulled away from the skull, or large chunks of hair pulled off. As a result of this, it has become industry standard for companies to require weavers to either keep hair up and tied, or to keep their hair short so as not to allow it to become tangled. Also, due to possible pinch points on the front of machines, loose, baggy clothing is prohibited. In addition, there is a risk of the shuttle flying out of the loom at a high-speed (200+ mph/322 kmh) and striking a worker if the moving reed encounters a thread/yarn or other mechanical jam/error. One complication for weavers, in the terms of safety, is the loud nature in which weave mills operate (115dB+). Because of this, it is nearly impossible to hear a person calling for help when entangled. This has led OSHA to outline specific guidelines for companies to mitigate the chances of such accidents occurring. However, even with such guidelines in place, injuries in textile production due to the machines themselves, are still commonplace.

See also
 Dobby loom
 Jacquard loom
 Paul Moody
 James Henry Northrop
 Northrop Loom
 Textile Manufacturing - the Industrial Revolution
 Cotton - Spinning, Winding, Warping and Weaving

References

Citations

Bibliography

External links

Textile machinery
Weaving equipment
English inventions
History of the textile industry
Industrial Revolution in England
Articles containing video clips